The 1963 Six Hour Le Mans was an endurance race for Sports Cars, Touring Cars & Grand Touring Cars. The race was held at the Caversham Airfield circuit in Western Australia on 3 June 1963. It was the ninth annual Six Hour Le Mans race.

The race was won by Jeff Dunkerton driving a Lotus Super 7. The winning car completed 194 laps, a total distance of 427 miles (688 km).

Race results

References

Further reading
Le Mans Distance A Record, The West Australian, Tuesday, 4 June 1963, page 10
The big names in motor sport win on BP, (advertisement for BP Super and BP Energol oil), The West Australian, Tuesday, 4 June 1963, page 32
Caversham Results, The West Australian, Tuesday, 11 June 1963
Jim Shepherd, A History of Australian Motor Sport, Sportsbook Publishing Co., 1980

Six Hours Le Mans
Six Hour Le Mans
June 1963 sports events in Australia